The 1997 Findlay Oilers football team was an American football team that represented the University of Findlay as a member of the Midwest League within the Mid-States Football Association (MSFA) during the 1997 NAIA football season. In their 23rd season under head coach Dick Strahm, the Oilers compiled a perfect 14–0 record (6–0 against conference opponents), outscored opponents by a total of 567 to 179, and won the NAIA national championship, defeating , 14–7, in the NAIA Championship Game.

Schedule

References

Findlay Oilers
Findlay Oilers football seasons
NAIA Football National Champions
College football undefeated seasons
Findlay Oilers football